The Ninety-Sixth Wisconsin Legislature convened from January 6, 2003, to May 19, 2004, in regular session, and held a concurrent special session from January 30, 2003, to February 20, 2003.  They also held seven extraordinary sessions during the term.

This was the first legislative session after the redistricting of the Senate and Assembly according to the 2002 federal court decision, Baumgart v. Wendelberger.

Senators representing odd-numbered districts were newly elected for this session and were serving the first two years of a four-year term.  Assembly members were elected to a two-year term.  Assembly members and odd-numbered senators were elected in the general election of November 5, 2002.  Senators representing even-numbered districts were serving the third and fourth year of their four-year term, having been elected in the general election of November 7, 2000.

Major events
 January 6, 2003: Inauguration of Jim Doyle as the 44th Governor of Wisconsin.
 February 1, 2003: U.S. Space Shuttle Columbia disintegrated during re-entry, killing all seven crew members aboard.
 March 20, 2003: The United States invaded Iraq, initiating the Iraq War.
 April 9, 2003: U.S. military forces seized control of Baghdad.
 April 14, 2003: The Human Genome Project was completed.
 May 28, 2003: The U.S. Jobs and Growth Tax Relief Reconciliation Act of 2003 was signed into law.
 July 1, 2003: Tesla, Inc., was founded in San Carlos, California.
 July 14, 2003: Valerie Plame was outed as a CIA agent by columnist Robert Novak, initiating a scandal.
 December 8, 2003: The U.S. Medicare Prescription Drug, Improvement, and Modernization Act was signed into law.
 December 13, 2003: Saddam Hussein was captured by U.S. military forces in Ad-Dawr, Iraq.
 February 4, 2004: Facebook was created by Mark Zuckerberg at Harvard University.
 February 29, 2004: Haitian president Jean-Bertrand Aristide was overthrown in a coup d'état.
 March 29, 2004: Bulgaria, Estonia, Latvia, Lithuania, Romania, Slovakia, and Slovenia were admitted to NATO.
 May 17, 2004: Massachusetts became the first U.S. state to issue marriage licenses for Same-sex marriages.
 June 5, 2004: Former U.S. president Ronald Reagan died at his home in Los Angeles, California.
 September 13, 2004: The Federal Assault Weapons Ban expired.
 November 2, 2004: George W. Bush re-elected as President of the United States.
 December 17, 2004: The U.S. Intelligence Reform and Terrorism Prevention Act was signed into law.
 December 26, 2004: The 2004 Indian Ocean earthquake and tsunami resulted in more than 200,000 deaths in southeast Asia.

Party summary

Senate summary

Assembly summary

Sessions 
 Regular session: January 6, 2003May 19, 2004
 January 2003 Special session: January 30, 2003February 20, 2003
 February 2003 Extraordinary session: February 20, 2003February 21, 2003
 July 2003 Extraordinary session: July 1, 2003July 2, 2003
 August 2003 Extraordinary session: August 11, 2003September 25, 2003
 December 2003 Extraordinary session: December 1, 2003February 5, 2004
 March 2004 Extraordinary session: March 11, 2004March 25, 2004
 May 2004 Extraordinary session: May 18, 2004May 19, 2004
 July 2004 Extraordinary session: July 27, 2004July 28, 2004

Leadership

Senate leadership
 President of the Senate: Alan Lasee 
 President pro tempore: Robert Welch

Majority leadership (Republican)
 Majority Leader: Mary Panzer
 Assistant Majority Leader: David Zien
 Majority Caucus Chairperson: Mary Lazich
 Majority Caucus Vice Chairperson: Joe Leibham

Minority leadership (Democratic)
 Minority Leader: Jon Erpenbach
 Assistant Minority Leader: Dave Hansen
 Minority Caucus Chairperson: Robert Wirch

Assembly leadership
 Speaker of the Assembly: John Gard
 Speaker pro tempore: Stephen Freese

Majority leadership (Republican)
 Majority Leader: Steven Foti
 Assistant Majority Leader: Jean Hundertmark
 Majority Caucus Chairperson: Daniel P. Vrakas
 Majority Caucus Vice Chairperson: Glenn Grothman
 Majority Caucus Secretary: Carol Owens
 Majority Caucus Sergeant at Arms: Jerry Petrowski

Minority leadership (Democratic)
 Minority Leader: James Kreuser
 Assistant Minority Leader: Jon Richards
 Minority Caucus Chairperson: Robert L. Turner
 Minority Caucus Vice Chairperson: Gary Sherman
 Minority Caucus Secretary: Amy Sue Vruwink
 Minority Caucus Sergeant at Arms:  Jennifer Shilling

Members

Members of the Senate
Members of the Wisconsin Senate for the Ninety-sixth Wisconsin Legislature (33):

Members of the Assembly
Members of the Assembly for the Ninety-sixth Wisconsin Legislature (99):

Changes from the 95th Legislature
The most significant structural change to the Legislature between the 95th and 96th sessions was the reapportionment and redistricting of legislative seats.  The new districts were defined in the federal court decision Baumgart v. Wendelberger, from a three-judge panel of the United States District Court for the Eastern District of Wisconsin.

Notes

References

External links
 Wisconsin State Senate
 Wisconsin State Assembly
 2003–2004 Session from Wisconsin Legislature
 2003–2004 Assembly Journal
 2003–2004 Senate Journal

Wisconsin legislative sessions
2003 in Wisconsin
2004 in Wisconsin
Wisconsin
Wisconsin
2003 establishments in Wisconsin